Chrysomyza africana is a species of ulidiid or picture-winged fly in the genus Chrysomyza of the family Tephritidae.

References

Chrysomyza